Christopher James Makins, 2nd Baron Sherfield (23 July 1942 – 28 January 2006) was an Anglo-American diplomat, foreign policy expert, and author.

Early life
Christopher James Makins was born at Southampton, New York on 23 July 1942, the son of a British father Roger Mellor Makins, later 1st Baron Sherfield and an American mother, Alice Brooks Davis, daughter of the American sportsman and politician Dwight F. Davis. Thus he held dual citizenship of the UK and the United States.

He was educated at St Ronan's School, Winchester College, and New College, Oxford. After taking a first-class degree in Modern History in 1963, he was elected a Fellow of All Souls (1963–1977).

Career
From 1964 until 1975, he served in H. M. Diplomatic Service. In 1975, he married American photographer, writer, and illustrator Wendy Whitney Cortesi, daughter of John Sargent Whitney of Evergreen, Colorado and jewellery designer Minna Reese Marston. The family lived in Washington, D.C., where he worked for the Trilateral Commission (Deputy Director 1975–1976), the Carnegie Endowment for International Peace, and the Aspen Institute (Executive Vice-president 1989–1997) before becoming President of the Atlantic Council of the United States (1999–2005). He was a Senior Adviser to the German Marshall Fund (1997–1999 and 2005–2006) and President of the Marshall Sherfield Foundation, which he had established in memory of his father.

He wrote or contributed to numerous articles and reports over the course of his career, including The Study of Europe in the United States: A Report to the German Marshall Fund of the United States and the Delegation of the European Commission to the United States (1998).

He was also an art collector and active on the boards of arts organisations such as the Phillips Collection, Washington Concert Opera, and WETA.

Death
He died from complications of head and neck cancer on 28 January 2006, aged 63, at his home in Georgetown, Washington, D.C.

Arms

Legacy
In 2005, the Atlantic Council of the United States established the Christopher J. Makins Lecture Series, which focuses on "the state of the strategic Atlantic partnership, its future direction and the prospects for the furtherance of common European and U.S. interests in order to facilitate strong and lasting global leadership." The inaugural lecture was delivered on 31 May 2006 by The Hon. Zbigniew Brzezinski. Subsequent speakers have included former President of Latvia, Dr. Vaira Vīķe-Freiberga (2007); Dr. Henry Kissinger (2009); and former Secretary General of NATO, Lord George Robertson (2010).

References

Sources
ThePeerage.com
Louie Estrada, 'Christopher Makins; Expert on Security Policy', Washington Post, Wednesday, February 1, 2006, p. B06
Marshall Sherfield Fellowships
Remembering Christopher Makins
The Study of Europe in the United States by Christopher J. Makins, Donald Hancock, and Fritz W. Scharpf
Debrett's People of Today (12th edn, London, 1999), p. 1778

1942 births
2006 deaths
British diplomats
Barons in the Peerage of the United Kingdom
Alumni of New College, Oxford
Fellows of All Souls College, Oxford
People educated at Winchester College
American art collectors
English art collectors
Deaths from cancer in Washington, D.C.
People from Georgetown (Washington, D.C.)
Sherfield